The 2017 FIG World Cup circuit in Rhythmic Gymnastics is a series of competitions officially organized and promoted by the International Gymnastics Federation.

The main difference introduced in 2017 is that the World Cup series is now split in: 1) the World Cup series; and 2) the World Challenge Cup series. Previously, events at the Rhythmic Gymnastics World Cup series were divided in Category A and Category B; Category A events were reserved for invited athletes, while Category B events were open to all athletes. Also, there was no limit for the number of Category A and Category B meets each year. Now, there is a maximum of four World Cup events. All of the World Cup and World Challenge Cup events are open to all athletes. Winners of the World Cup trophy were announced after the conclusion of the last event in the World Cup series, in Sofia, Bulgaria.

With stopovers in Europe and Asia, the World Cup competitions were scheduled for April 7–9 in Pesaro (ITA), April 21–23 in Tashkent (UZB), April 28–30 in Baku (AZE), and May 5–7 in Sofia (BUL). World Challenge Cup competitions are scheduled for May 12–14 in Portimão (POR), June 2–4 in Guadalajara (ESP), July 7–9 in Berlin (GER), August 5–6 in Minsk (BLR), and August 11–13 in Kazan (RUS).

Formats

Medal winners

All-around

Individual

Group

Apparatus

Hoop

Ball

Clubs

Ribbon

5 hoops

3 balls and 2 ropes

Overall medal table

Overall winners

The overall winners of the World Cup trophy were announced after the conclusion of the final stage, in Sofia, on May 7, 2017. Neviana Vladinova (BUL) was the individual all-around overall winner with 115 points, the ball winner with 115 points and the ribbon winner with 135 points. Arina Averina (RUS) was the hoop winner with 100 points, and Alina Harnasko (BLR) was the clubs winner with 135 points.

See also
 2017 FIG Artistic Gymnastics World Cup series

References

Rhythmic Gymnastics World Cup
2017 in gymnastics